"The Fire" is the 84th episode of the NBC sitcom Seinfeld and the 20th episode of the fifth season. It originally aired on May 5, 1994, on NBC. This was the final episode to be written by Larry Charles. In this episode, Elaine's co-worker Toby annoys her with her enthusiasm and ruins one of Jerry's shows with well-meaning heckling, Kramer becomes a hero while saving Toby's severed pinky toe, and George exposes his own cowardice when he discovers a fire at a children's birthday party.

Plot
Kramer is at Pendant Publishing discussing his idea of a coffee table book about coffee tables with Elaine and her hyperenthusiastic co-worker Toby, whom Elaine can not stand. Kramer invites Toby to see Jerry's act, where she variously cheers, boos, and hisses him, thinking this to be part of the stand-up comedy experience. Out of consideration for Kramer, Jerry refrains from making any retort against her and becomes flustered, earning a bad review from a major magazine critic who was present. Jerry confronts Toby after the show and she insults him that he won't make it in the comedy business if he "can't take it" (the heckling). George suggests that Jerry get the "ultimate comedian's revenge" by going to her place of work and heckling her in return.

George attends his girlfriend Robin's son's birthday party. He gets into a heated argument with the birthday clown "Eric", because Eric does not know about Bozo the Clown, which George finds inconceivable. George then panics when a small grease fire breaks out in the kitchen. He pushes down everyone in his path, including Robin's son and mother and an elderly woman with a walker, in his rush to get out. Afterward George pathetically tries to defend his actions, but no one buys his lying. Disgusted by George's cowardice, Robin breaks up with him.

Jerry goes to Pendant Publishing and heckles Toby. Upset, she runs out of the building where her foot is run over by a street sweeper, severing her pinky toe. After an ambulance takes her away, Kramer finds the toe, boards a bus, and fights a gunman to get to the hospital, where her toe is successfully reattached. To Elaine's indignation, Toby receives a promotion that Elaine had wanted because her boss felt sorry for her because of the accident. Toby's first order of business is getting Kramer's coffee table book published.

Jerry convinces the critic to return to the comedy club to judge his performance again. Inspired by Kramer's heroic toe recovery, George approaches Robin at the club and asks for a second chance, saying he's changed; Robin is hesitant to accept him back. However, when he spots a prop comic holding a fake gun, he screams, panics and runs away (as he did with the fire), further disappointing Robin and ruining Jerry's act.

Production
Writer Larry Charles said the episode was sparked by the mental image of George pushing women and children out of his way to escape a fire, and he built the rest of the episode off of this starting image. The Toby/Elaine rivalry was inspired by the office politics at a show next door to Seinfeld; one of the employees had lost a baby, and some of her co-workers were jealous of the attention their boss gave her because of this tragedy.

The voice that announces Jerry's name before he goes on stage is that of show co-creator Larry David. Robin was played by Melanie Chartoff, whom Larry David and Michael Richards knew from the time they worked on the short-lived sketch series Fridays. Jon Favreau made his first television acting appearance in this episode as Eric the Clown.

It was originally planned that Kramer's adventure in the bus would be filmed in action, and the resulting footage intercut with the scene in which he recounts what happened. However, the audience reaction to Kramer's monologue was so positive that the bus scene was deemed unnecessary. The sequence where he finds the toe and ices it inside a Cracker Jack box was filmed, but not used, and appears among the deleted scenes in the DVD release.

Legacy
The Season 5 DVD contains an animated rendition of Kramer's telling of the pinky toe story as part of Seinimation, a series of short animated bonus features on DVDs of the last four seasons, directed by Eric Yahnker.

References

External links 
 

Seinfeld (season 5) episodes
1994 American television episodes